The 2009–10 Midland Football Alliance season was the 16th in the history of Midland Football Alliance, a football competition in England.

Clubs and League table
The league featured 19 clubs from the previous season, along with three new clubs:
Kirby Muxloe, promoted from the East Midlands Counties League
Loughborough University, promoted from the Midland Football Combination
Malvern Town, relegated from the Southern Football League

League Table

References

External links
 Midland Football Alliance

2009–10
9